Christoffel Cornelius Dednam (born 8 August 1983) is a badminton player from South Africa. Dednam was the gold medallists at the 2003 All-Africa Games in the mixed doubles event, and in 2007 in the men's doubles event. He competed at the 2004, 2008 Olympic Games, and at the 2006 Commonwealth Games. Dednam played badminton at the 2004 Summer Olympics in men's singles, losing in the round of 32 to Boonsak Ponsana of Thailand.  He also competed in mixed doubles with partner Antoinette Uys.  They lost to Tsai Chia-Hsin and Cheng Wen-Hsing of Chinese Taipei in the round of 32. At the 2008 Olympics, he played in the men's doubles event with his brother Roelof Dednam, but the duo was defeated by Howard Bach and Khan Bob Malaythong of United States in the first round.

Achievements

All-Africa Games 
Men's doubles

Mixed doubles

African Championships
Men's singles

Men's doubles

Mixed doubles

BWF International Challenge/Series
Men's singles

Men's doubles

Mixed doubles

 BWF International Challenge tournament
 BWF International Series tournament
 BWF Future Series tournament

References

External links
 
 
 
 
 
 

1983 births
Living people
Sportspeople from Bloemfontein
South African male badminton players
Badminton players at the 2004 Summer Olympics
Badminton players at the 2008 Summer Olympics
Olympic badminton players of South Africa
Badminton players at the 2006 Commonwealth Games
Commonwealth Games competitors for South Africa
Competitors at the 2003 All-Africa Games
Competitors at the 2007 All-Africa Games
African Games gold medalists for South Africa
African Games silver medalists for South Africa
African Games bronze medalists for South Africa
African Games medalists in badminton